Mordvinovo is a rural locality (a village) in Kovarditskoye Rural Settlement, Muromsky District, Vladimir Oblast, Russia. The population was 88 as of 2010.

Geography 
Mordvinovo is located 28 km northeast of Murom (the district's administrative centre) by road. Zaroslovo is the nearest rural locality.

References 

Rural localities in Muromsky District